Geminigeraceae is a family of cryptophytes containing the five genera Geminigera, Guillardia, Hanusia, Proteomonas and Teleaulax. They are characterised by chloroplasts containing Cr-phycoerythrin 545, and an inner periplast component (IPC) comprising "a sheet or a sheet and multiple plates if diplomorphic". The nucleomorphs are never in the pyrenoid, and there is never a scalariform furrow. The cells do, however, have a long, keeled rhizostyle with lamellae (wings).

References 

Cryptomonads
Eukaryote families